Jikradia olitoria is a species of leafhopper (family Cicadellidae) found mainly in eastern North America. The insect acts as a vector for the North American grapevine yellows.

References

External links

 

Cicadellidae
Insects described in 1830